Megha Mathew is an Indian actress who predominantly appears in Malayalam films. She made her debut in 2016 in Aanandam.

Acting career
Mathew started her film career  in the film Aanandam (2016). Aanandam is an Indian Malayalam romantic comedy film written and directed by Ganesh Raj in his directorial debut and produced by Vineeth Srinivasan. Subsequently, she was offered parts in Oru Mexican Aparatha also as a college student. Oru Mexican Aparatha is an Indian Malayalam film directed by Tom Emmatty along with Tovino Thomas, Roopesh Peethambaran, Neeraj Madhav.

Mathew's upcoming release is Sidhique Thamarassery's directorial debut Sakhavinte Priyasakhi.

Filmography

References 

Year of birth missing (living people)
Living people
Actresses from Kottayam
Actresses in Malayalam cinema